The 2012 I-League U20 was the fourth season of the Indian I-League U20 competition. The season ran alongside the closing stages of the 2011–12 I-League season. The AIFF development team, Pailan Arrows, did not field their team in the competition as they were already an U21-Team in the I-League. The preliminary phase of the 2012 U20 league was held played in three different cities, Kalyani, Mumbai and within the state of Goa. The final round of the competition was held in Kalyani with Pune F.C. Academy coming out as winners.

Teams

Group stage

Group A

Group B

Group C

Final round

Scorers

Overall

Final round

Leading scorers

Updated 21 May 2012

Other Scorers

Group stage

Leading scorers

Updated 28 April 2012

Other scorers

See also
 I-League

References

2011–12 in Indian football
I-League U20 seasons